Min Sook Lee (born 1969) is a Canadian documentary filmmaker, screenwriter, academic, and political activist. She was the New Democratic Party candidate for Toronto—Danforth during the 2019 federal election. She ran primarily on concerns about climate change, energy, economic equity, a national pharmacare program, child care programs, improved public transit systems, and the protection and expansion of affordable housing.

Early life
Lee was born in South Korea and immigrated to Canada with her family at the age of three, growing up in downtown Toronto, where her family owned a convenience store. Lee and her sisters worked long hours behind the counters, often translating for their parents, who did not speak English.

As a teenager, Lee joined the anti-apartheid movement in Toronto, which she credits with introducing her to political activism.

Career

Film 
Lee is a self-taught documentary filmmaker who has directed eight feature documentaries, often focusing on labour, migration, and social justice issues.

Early in her career, Lee was news director at community radio station CKLN-FM from 1996 to 1998, and a news reporter at television station Toronto 1 from 2004 to 2005.

Lee's first feature film El Contrato (2003) showed migrant farm workers from Central Mexico facing harsh working conditions in Leamington, Ontario. In response, Leamington farmers issued a SLAPP suit which delayed the film's release by a year. Lee was awarded the Cesar E. Chavez Black Eagle Award for the film.

Lee's 2005 film Hogtown: The Politics of Policing followed a dysfunctional City Hall struggle over the Toronto Police Service's budget during a wave of violent gun crimes and police corruption scandals. The film won the Best Canadian Feature Documentary award at the Hot Docs Canadian International Documentary Festival.

Lee also directed Tiger Spirit (2008), telling the story of Korean families divided by the Korean War and the border between North Korea and South Korea; My Toxic Baby (2009), about toxins in baby products;  The Real MASH (2010), which tells the story of the real people who inspired the movie and television series M*A*S*H; Badge of Pride (2010) about LGBT police officers; and The Real Inglorious Bastards (2012), about Frederick Mayer and his company of European Jewish refugees. Lee was co-creator of the television sitcom She's the Mayor, which aired on VisionTV. Tiger Spirit was awarded the Donald Brittain Award for Best Social/Political Documentary at the 2009 Gemini Awards. Her film The Real Inglorious Bastards won the 2014 Canadian Screen Award for Best History or Biography Documentary Program or Series.

In 2016, Lee revisited the theme of migrant workers in Canada in her film Migrant Dreams, which examined the plight of a group of mostly Indonesian migrant workers entering Canada through the Temporary Foreign Worker Program. She was awarded the Canadian Hillman Prize which honours journalists whose work identifies important social and economic issues in Canada and the Canadian Association of Journalists Award for Labour Reporting.

In 2012, the Mayworks Festival of Working People and the Arts named the Min Sook Lee Labour Arts Award in Lee's honour for her contribution to the cause of migrant workers, citing her work to "engage non-arts audiences, and that challenges Eurocentric notions of art".

Lee is an assistant professor at the OCAD University, where her teaching and research focus on the relationship between art and social change. She previously taught documentary filmmaking at Ryerson University's School of Image Arts MFA program.

Politics 
Lee was the New Democratic Party candidate in Toronto—Danforth for the 2019 federal election.  In her campaign, she committed to bring in a one per cent super-wealth tax on households with a net wealth of more than $20 million. The Parliamentary Budget Office has estimated that this measure could bring in $70 billion in new revenue. On election night, Lee finished in second with 33.2 per cent of the vote to incumbent Liberal MP Julie Dabrusin.

Awards and honours
2005    Winner of Best Canadian Feature Length Documentary Award, Hot Docs Festival for Hogtown: the Politics of Policing
2007    Recipient of the Cesar E. Chavez Black Eagle Award, presented by the United Farm Workers of America
2009    Winner of the Donald Brittain Award for Best Social/Political Documentary Program for Tiger Spirit
2012    Induction of the ‘Min Sook Lee Labour Arts Award’ presented by Mayworks Festival of Working People and the Arts
2014    Winner, Canadian Screen Award – Best History Documentary for The Real Inglorious Bastards
2016    Cinema Politica Alanis Obomsawin Award for Commitment to Community and Resistance
2017    Canadian Association of Journalists Award for Labour Reporting for Migrant Dreams
2017    Canadian Hillman Prize for Journalism for Migrant Dreams

Filmography

Electoral record

References

1969 births
Living people
Canadian documentary film producers
Canadian documentary film directors
Canadian television producers
Academic staff of OCAD University
Canadian television directors
Canadian women screenwriters
Film directors from Toronto
Writers from Toronto
Canadian Film Centre alumni
South Korean emigrants to Canada
Canadian writers of Asian descent
National Film Board of Canada people
Canadian Screen Award winners
Canadian women television directors
Canadian women television producers
21st-century Canadian women writers
21st-century Canadian screenwriters